The 2017 Pan American U20 Athletics Championships was the nineteenth edition of the biennial track and field competition for under-20 athletes from the Americas, organised by the Association of Panamerican Athletics. It was held in Trujillo, Peru, at the Mansiche Sports Complex from 21 to 23 July. The United States topped the medal table with 54 medals total including 22 gold.

Medal summary

Men

Women

Medal table

References

Pan American U20 Athletics Championships
International athletics competitions hosted by Peru
Pan American
Pan American Junior Athletics Championships
Pan American Junior Athletics Championships